Pologne, the French name for Poland, may refer to:

 , a historical area in 8th arrondissement of Paris
 Petite-Pologne, a historical region of south-eastern Poland
 Grande-Pologne, a historical region of west-central Poland
 La Pologne:
 Haitian Creole
 Polish Haitians
 Tour de Pologne, a road bicycle racing stage race in Poland
 Aigle Blanc de Pologne, Poland's highest order awarded to both civilians and the military for their merits
 Grand Orient de Pologne, Masonic grand lodge in Poland
 Le Moulin de Pologne, 1952 novel by the French writer Jean Giono
 La Pologne et les Affaires Occidentales, publication of L'Institut Occidental
 Union Cycliste de Pologne, national governing body of cycle racing in Poland

See also
 
 Polonaise (disambiguation)
 Polonia (disambiguation)
 Polen (disambiguation)